Colin Mawby KSG (9 May 1936 – 24 November 2019) was an English organist, choral conductor and composer. From 1961 he was Master of Music at Westminster Cathedral, then from 1981 he was the choral director at Radio Telefís Éireann. He composed masses dedicated to specific choirs, including in Germany. He was awarded Knighthood of the Order of St. Gregory in 2006.

Early life and education 
Mawby was born in Portsmouth, Hampshire, on 9 May 1936. He received his earliest musical education at Westminster Cathedral choir school, where he acted as assistant to George Malcolm at the organ from the age of 12. The boys sang 14 or 15 services a week and had 10 hours of rehearsals a week, learning plainchant and polyphony. He subsequently studied at the Royal College of Music with Gordon Jacob and John Churchill. During this time he worked with Adrian Boult and Malcolm Sargent.

Career 
He became Assistant and then in 1961 Master of Music at Westminster Cathedral. Whilst there he conducted the first performance of the early music vocal ensemble Pro Cantione Antiqua. He also collaborated with the London Mozart Players, the Wren Orchestra, the Belgian Radio Choir and the BBC Singers. He performed for the Queen of the United Kingdom at St Paul's Cathedral, for President John F. Kennedy at Westminster Cathedral, and at St. Peter's Basilica for Pope Paul VI and Pope John Paul II.

In 1976 he moved to Dublin where he became choral director at Radio Telefís Éireann in 1981. He founded the RTÉ Philharmonic Choir and the RTÉ children's choir (RTÉ Cór na nÓg) in 1985. He also founded the RTÉ Chamber Choir. Mawby retired to East Anglia in 2001 but returned to County Dublin in Ireland briefly, moved to London, then Dublin again before returning to London. In 2006, Mawby was awarded by Pope Benedict XVI the Knighthood of the Order of St. Gregory, "in gratitude for past and continuing services to church music".

Works 
Mawby's music for the English Catholic liturgy is prolific. He composed several masses, motets, antiphons and hymn settings. His Ave verum corpus for choir and a setting of Psalm 23 won fame in the recording by Charlotte Church. His Requiem of Hope for soprano, mixed choir and organ, composed from 1995 to 2002, is based on texts by Henry Vaughan, John Henry Newman and anonymous texts. In 2002, his Prayer of Forgiveness was awarded "Top Honors" in the competition "Waging Peace Through Singing" in Oregon, USA. A Te Deum for soprano solo, chorus, organ and brass ensemble was premiered in Cambridge in 2006 to mark his 70th birthday. His setting of Laudate Pueri Dominum was premiered in 2011 at Westminster Cathedral Hall.

His secular works include two operas for young people, The Torc of Gold (1996) and The Quest (2000, premiered in 2001), both on a libretto by playwright Maeve Ingoldsby, commissioned by the National Chamber Choir and premiered in Dublin under his direction. On a commission by St. Bonifatius, Wiesbaden, he composed in 2011 the Missa solemnis Bonifatius-Messe for soprano, choir, children's choir, oboe and organ, premiered in his presence on 3 October 2012 to celebrate the 150th anniversary of the Chor von St. Bonifatius, with the choir and children's choir conducted by Gabriel Dessauer.

Mawby commented on his writing for choirs in 2006: "I cannot write choral music unless I work with choirs. Now that's a subjective judgement: I know that lots of people can do these things; I can’t. I have to write for particular people." His works are published internationally, in Germany by Dr. J. Butz, and in Italy by Eurarte and Casa Musicale Carrara.

Colin Mawby died on 24 November 2019.

References

External links 
 
 
 Colin Mawby Butz Verlag
 Colin Mawby Zimbel Press
 Über Colin Mawby (*1936) (in German) Biederitzer Kantorei 2007

1936 births
2019 deaths
Musicians from Portsmouth
Alumni of the Royal College of Music
Cathedral organists
English composers
English conductors (music)
British male conductors (music)
English classical organists
British male organists
Knights of St. Gregory the Great
Composers awarded knighthoods
Conductors (music) awarded knighthoods
Musicians awarded knighthoods
RTÉ Performing Groups
21st-century British conductors (music)
21st-century organists
Male classical organists